Zamigolvepalle is a village in Krishna district of the Indian state of Andhra Pradesh. It is located in Pamarru mandal.

References 

Villages in Krishna district